Philip Antrobus may refer to:

Sir Philip Humphrey Antrobus, 6th Baronet (1876–1968) of the Antrobus Baronets
Sir Philip Coutts Antrobus, 7th Baronet (1908–1995) of the Antrobus Baronets